Mina Do is a village in Badakhshan Province in northeast Afghanistan.

Geography

Transport

See also
Badakhshan Province

References

External links
Satellite map at Maplandia.com

Populated places in Kuran wa Munjan District